Kalarickal Manikanda Swami temple is an ancient temple in Thrikkodithanam village in Kottayam District, Kerala, India.

Lord Siva is the main prathista (idol). The tomb of Kalarickal Gurunathan is also present in the temple. It is said that Karikal Gurunathan was a kalari (traditional kerala martial arts) expert and helped the king of Thrikkodithanam. It is believed that Gurunthan's birthplace is Edappali, Kochi.

Temple renovation is in progress and it attracts many devotees.

References
http://www.thrikodithanam.org/

See also
 Temples of Kerala

Hindu temples in Kottayam district